Sur Roche railway station is a railway station in the municipality of Échallens, in the Swiss canton of Vaud.

Services 
 the following services stop at Sur Roche:

References

External links 
 
 

Railway stations in the canton of Vaud
Lausanne–Echallens–Bercher Railway stations